"(I've Got a Gal in) Kalamazoo" is a #1 popular song recorded by Glenn Miller and His Orchestra in 1942. It was written by Mack Gordon and Harry Warren and published in 1942. It was featured in the musical film Orchestra Wives and was recorded by Glenn Miller and His Orchestra, featuring Tex Beneke, Marion Hutton and The Modernaires, who released it as an A side 78 in 1942, 27934-A. The B side was "At Last".

Background

The song popularized the city of Kalamazoo, Michigan. Although originally recorded by the Glenn Miller band with Tex Beneke on lead vocals, it was recreated by the fictional Gene Morrison Orchestra performing as the Glenn Miller Band and the Nicholas Brothers (performing the song as part of a dance sequence) in the 1942 20th Century Fox movie Orchestra Wives. The song was nominated for Best Music, Original Song at the Academy Awards, Harry Warren (music), Mack Gordon (lyrics).

The song was recorded on May 20, 1942 in Hollywood. The arrangement was by Jerry Gray. The personnel on "(I've Got a Gal in) Kalamazoo": Tex Beneke, Marion Hutton, the Modernaires (vocals), Billy May, John Best, Steve Lipkins, R.D. McMickle (trumpet), Glenn Miller, Jim Priddy, Paul Tanner, Frank D'Annolfo (trombone), Lloyd "Skip" Martin, Wilbur Schwartz (clarinet, alto saxophone), Tex Beneke, Al Klink (tenor saxophone), Ernie Caceres (baritone saxophone), Chummy MacGregor (piano), Bobby Hackett (guitar), Edward "Doc" Goldberg (string bass), and Maurice Purtill (drums).

Reception
The Glenn Miller record was the year's best-selling recording in the United States, according to Billboard magazine. It spent nineteen weeks on the Billboard charts, including eight weeks in first place. The song was nominated for an Academy Award in the category of "Best Music, Original Song" in 1943.

See also
List of number-one singles of 1942 (U.S.)

External links
Full Lyrics at LyricsOnDemand.com

References

1942 songs
1942 singles
Songs with music by Harry Warren
Songs with lyrics by Mack Gordon
Glenn Miller songs
Songs written for films
Number-one singles in the United States
Pop standards
Songs about Michigan
RCA Victor singles